TAPSO is used to make buffer solutions. It has a pKa value of 7.635 (I=0, 25°C). It can be used to make buffer solutions in the pH range 7.0-8.2.

References 

Buffer solutions